A Bottle in the Gaza Sea is a 2011 drama directed by Thierry Binisti. The film, an international co-production shot in French, Hebrew and Arabic, is based on the French young adult novel Une bouteille dans la mer de Gaza by Valérie Zenatti, originally published in 2005 and adapted for the screen by Zenatti and Binisti.  Zenatti taught Agathe Bonitzer Hebrew in preparation for starring in the film.

Plot
Tal (Agathe Bonitzer) is the 17-year-old daughter of recent French immigrants to Israel who live in Jerusalem. Following a bomb attack on a local café, she throws a bottle into the sea near Gaza with a message asking for an explanation. Naïm (Mahmoud Shalaby), a sensitive but aimless 20-year-old Palestinian living in Gaza, discovers the bottle and tries to answer Tal's question by initiating an email correspondence. Their mutual suspicion soon develops into a tender friendship.

Cast

References

External links
  
 
 

2010s Arabic-language films
2010s French-language films
2010s Hebrew-language films
2011 drama films
Canadian drama films
French drama films
Israeli drama films
Israeli–Palestinian conflict films
Films shot in Israel
Films set in Jerusalem
Films set in the Gaza Strip
Films based on French novels
Gaza–Israel conflict
French multilingual films
Canadian multilingual films
Israeli multilingual films
2011 multilingual films
2011 films
2010s Canadian films
2010s French films